The Canet guns were a series of weapon systems developed by the French engineer Gustave Canet (1846–1908), who worked as an engineer from 1872 to 1881 for the London Ordnance Works, then for Forges et Chantiers de la Méditerranée, and from 1897 to 1907 for Schneider et Cie of Le Creusot.

320 mm naval guns

Canet developed a  38 cal naval gun, an extremely powerful weapon for its time, specifically for the export market. The gun was first selected by the Spanish Navy in 1884 as part of a large naval expansion program which called for six new battleships.

The usage was consistent with the Jeune École philosophy, which advocated placing overwhelming firepower (strong guns, torpedoes) on relatively small ships. This philosophy was of great interest to the Imperial Japanese Navy, which lacked the resources at the time to purchase modern pre-dreadnought battleships.

The guns proved only marginally successful during the First Sino-Japanese War, due to a slow rate of fire, and numerous mechanical problems. The guns could not be aimed abeam, as their weight would cause the ship to roll over when fired. In combat, gunners were able to fire only around one shot per hour due to the time it took to reload.

Other guns

M.Canet is also known for the development of the Schneider-Canet gun system for 75 mm iron BL mountain guns, and rapid-fire 120 mm and 152 mm guns.

References

Bibliography

External links

 The Canet gun

Naval guns of France
Artillery of France
320 mm artillery